The Novares Group is a French manufacturer of car parts. It was started in 1955 by Charles Manni, and was previously known as Mecaplast. Thierry Manni is chairman of the board, and the chief executive officer is Pierre Boulet. Mecaplast merged with Key Plastics in 2016, and in 2017 the combined firm changed its name to Novares.

History 

The company was started in 1955 by Charles Manni. 

During the financial crisis of 2007–2008 some workers were made redundant, and some plants were closed.

In August 2009 the company was nominated as a strategic supplier for PSA and Renault, and so benefitted from the Modernization Fund for Automobile Equipment Suppliers (FMEA) which increased the company’s capital by €55 million/33% stake.
The Chennai plant in India was opened on 3 June 2010. A factory was opened in Zrenjanin, Serbia, in 2012.

In 2016 a majority holding in the company was sold to Equistone Partners Europe, a private investment company. Later that year, Mecaplast acquired and merged with Key Plastics, an American car parts company. About a year later the combined operation was renamed Novares. In 2018 the group arranged for its shares to be floated on the Euronext Paris exchange, but the flotation was cancelled.

In March 2020 the company received a cash injection af €45 million from its stockholders Equistone and BPI Paris. In April of that year it went into receivership.

Figures 

Revenue in M€/Workforce

References 

Auto parts suppliers of France